Margaret Newman may refer to:

 Margaret Potter (1926–1998), née Newman, British writer 
 Margaret Newman (nurse) (born 1933), American nurse, university professor and nursing theorist